Tangerine is the fourth full-length album by singer-songwriter David Mead. Having been dropped by Nettwerk America after the release of his previous LP, Indiana, he created his own label, Tallulah!, in order to release Tangerine in 2006. "Mead's is some of the most consistently attractive, melodically pleasing, and intellectually rewarding pop music around, and it would really be a shame if he 'moved beyond' his most obvious strengths anytime soon," wrote Rick Anderson for AllMusic. "Few records this immediately attractive are still so interesting after repeated listens."

Track listing
All tracks written by David Mead.

 "Tangerine" – 1:40
 "Hard to Remember" – 3:07
 "The Trouble With Henry" – 3:07
 "Chatterbox" – 4:16
 "Reminded #1" – 2:43
 "Hunting Season" – 4:19
 "Fighting for Your Life" – 3:51
 "Sugar on the Knees" – 3:35
 "Hallelujah, I Was Wrong" – 2:37
 "Suddenly, a Summer Night" – 3:42
 "Making It Up Again" – 4:02
 "Choosing Teams" – 3:44

Personnel 
Keith Brogdon – drums ("The Trouble With Henry," "Chatterbox," "Hallelujah, I Was Wrong," "Making It Up Again")
 Chris Carmichael - violins, violas
David Henry – cello
Jim Hoke – saxophone, flute, penny whistle, autoharp
Lindsay Jamieson – drums, percussion
Brad Jones – bass guitars, Rhodes piano, grand piano, Hammond organ, harmonium, theremin, calliope, background vocals ("Chatterbox")
David Mead – lead vocals, guitars (acoustic, electric, classical, steel-string, bass), ukulele, mandolin, pianos (Rhodes, grand, toy), clavinet, mellotron, vibraphone, glockenspiel
Fessey Park – vocals ("Reminded #1," "Hallelujah, I Was Wrong," "Making It Up Again")

Production notes
Recorded by Brad Jones and mastered by Jim DeMain. Illustrations by Natalie Cox Mead and art direction/layout by Heather Dryden.

References

David Mead (musician) albums
2006 albums